A Parcel of Steeleye Span, full title A Parcel of Steeleye Span: Their First Five Chrysalis Albums 1972-1975, is a 2009 remastered box set of Steeleye Span's first five Chrysalis albums: Below the Salt, Parcel of Rogues, Now We Are Six, Commoners Crown, All Around My Hat.

Track listing
All tracks are "2009 Digital Remasters" unless stated otherwise.

All songs are Traditional, arr. Hart, Johnson, Kemp, Knight, Pegrum, Prior, except where noted.

Disc 1:
 Spotted Cow 3:08
 Rosebud in June 3:43
 Jigs (Medley) 3:13
 Sheepcrook and Black Dog 4:45
 Royal Forester 4:36
 King Henry 7:12
 Gaudete 2:27
 John Barleycorn 4:50
 Saucy Sailor 5:52
 Gaudete (Single Version) 2:27
 The Holly and the Ivy 2:25
 One Misty Moisty Morning 3:32
 Alison Gross 5:30
 The Bold Poachers 4:18
 The Ups and Downs 2:46
 Robbery with Violins 1:46
 Tracks 1-9 from Below the Salt
 Tracks 12-16 from Parcel of Rogues
 All songs: Traditional, arr. Hart, Johnson, Kemp, Knight, Prior

Disc 2:
 The Wee Wee Man (Trad; Hart, Johnson, Kemp, Knight, Prior) 4:00
 The Weaver and the Factory Maid (Trad; Hart, Johnson, Kemp, Knight, Prior) 5:23
 Rogues in a Nation (Robert Burns) 4:35
 Cam Ye O'er Frae France (Trad; Hart, Johnson, Kemp, Knight, Prior) 2:49
 Hares on the Mountain (Trad; Hart, Johnson, Kemp, Knight, Prior) 4:35
 Bonny Moorhen 4:18
 Seven Hundred Elves 5:19
 Drink Down The Moon 6:29
 Now We Are Six 2:23
 Thomas the Rhymer 6:44
 The Mooncoin Jig 3:57
 Edwin 4:46
 Long-a-Growing 4:05
 Two Magicians 4:29
 Twinkle, Twinkle Little Star (Jane Taylor) 1:32
 To Know Him is to Love Him (Phil Spector) 2:45
 The Wife Of Ushers Well (Live At The Rainbow) 4:44
 Tracks 1-5 from Parcel of Rogues
 Tracks 7-16 from Now We Are Six

Disc 3:
 Little Sir Hugh 4:45
 Bach Goes to Limerick (Hart, Johnson, Kemp, Knight, Pegrum, Prior) 3:41
 Long Lankin 8:42
 Dogs and Ferrets 2:45
 Galtee Farmer 3:47
 Demon Lover 5:54
 Elf Call 3:56
 Weary Cutters 2:03
 New York Girls 3:16
 Black Jack Davy 4:19
 Hard Times of Old England 5:15
 Cadgwith Anthem 2:48
 Sum Waves 4:04
 The Wife of Ushers Well 4:36
 Gamble Gold (Robin Hood) 3:44
 All Around My Hat 4:11
 Dance with Me 3:56
 Batchelors Hall 5:47
 Tracks 1-9 from Commoners Crown
 Tracks 10-18 from All Around My Hat

Steeleye Span albums
2009 compilation albums